Glossodia, commonly known as waxlip orchids, was a genus of mostly purple orchids from Australia. The genus was first formally described in 1810 by the prolific Scottish botanist Robert Brown who published his description in Prodromus florae Novae Hollandiae.

Only two species were recognised: 
Glossodia major R.Br. now known as Caladenia major - waxlip orchid, native to Queensland, New South Wales, Victoria, Tasmania and South Australia;
Glossodia minor R.Br.  now known as Caladenia minorata - small waxlip orchid, native to Queensland, New South Wales and Victoria.

In 2015, as a result of studies of molecular phylogenetics, Mark Clements transferred the two Glossodia species to Caladenia.

Although the change from Glossodia to Caladenia is recognised by Royal Botanic Gardens, Kew, "Glossodia" is still used by Australian herbaria, including the National Herbarium of New South Wales.

References 

Caladeniinae
Diurideae genera
Orchids of Australia
Plants described in 1810
Historically recognized angiosperm genera